Goalie is a 2019 Canadian biographical sports film about the hockey goaltender Terry Sawchuk. The film was directed and co-written by Adriana Maggs. Sawchuk is played by Mark O'Brien. The film was given a limited release on March 1, 2019.

The film does not use official NHL jerseys due to legal reasons. This is also Sean McCann's final film before his death three months later in June 2019.

Plot
Interspersed with on-ice-action, Terry Sawchuk's autopsy and its cataloging of bodily injury ends with a still of this greatest goalie from the NHL's original six era, and overscreen text of his accomplishments.

The early life of Terry Sawchuk in Winnipeg, Manitoba is portrayed as lower middle class. He follows in his older brothers footsteps in becoming a pond hockey goalie. Meeting success, he is drafted by Trader Jack Adams to replace a winning but injured goalie for the Detroit Red Wings. In the age of maskless goalies, Terry is shown receiving pucks to his face, and helping to lead his team to victory.

Caught up in his intense and sometimes glamorous new world, Sawchuk marries a Detroit woman and they start a family. They move to Boston when he is traded to the Bruins. After he becomes alcoholic, abusive and a philanderer, they divorce.

As Sawchuk moves around the league, goaltenders begin wearing masks and teams hire more than one goalie per team. Sawchuk visits with his mentor Trader Jack, who recommends Sawchuk retire to enjoy life and teases him for having been gullible, as Jack had leveraged belonging for heroics.

Battered by a career on the ice, Sawchuk dies from an otherwise insignificant injury, sustained in a drunken argument. He was employed as a goalie by the New York Rangers at that time.

Cast

Mark O'Brien as Terry Sawchuk
Kevin Pollak as Jack Adams
Georgina Reilly as Pat (Morey/Sawchuk)
Éric Bruneau as Marcel (Pronovost)
Steve Byers as Gordie (Howe)
Ted Atherton as Louis Sawchuk
Janine Theriault as Anne Sawchuk
Matt Gordon as Tommy Ivan
Jonny Harris as Phil Sullivan
Sean McCann as (70-year-old) Red Storey
The roles of married couple Terry and Pat are played by real life married couple O'Brien and Reilly.

Cinematography
The cinematography by Jason Tan, "which has a fittingly vintage edge that does make one feel as though one is watching archival footage from the mid-twentieth century NHL" was commended. It is characterized by a sepia tone.

Awards

References

External links

2019 films
2010s biographical films
2010s sports films
Canadian ice hockey films
Canadian biographical films
English-language Canadian films
Films shot in Toronto
Films shot in Greater Sudbury
2010s English-language films
2010s Canadian films